Zelig is a name meaning "blessed" in Yiddish. It may be both a given name and a surname.
Variants: Zelik, Selig.

Notable people with the name include:

Given name
 Froim-Zelig Aderca
Zelig Bardichever
Zelig Reuven Bengis
Zelig Bidner
Zelig Eshhar
 Zellig Harris (1909–1992), American linguist
Zelig Kalmanovich
 Zelig Mogulescu or Sigmund Mogulesko (1858–1914), actor in Yiddish theater
Yitzchak Zelig Morgenstern
Zelig Pliskin
Simcha Zelig Reguer
Zelig Sharfstein
Zelig Shtroch
 Chaim Zelig Slonimski

Surname
 Jack Zelig (1888–1912), an American gangster
Dariusz Zelig

See also 
 
 
Seeliger
Seligmann (disambiguation)
 Seligman (disambiguation)

Yiddish-language surnames